Taduri Bala Goud (2 October 1931 – 1 March 2010) was an Indian politician and member of the Indian National Congress. He was 2 time Member of parliament (MP), represented the Nizamabad constituency in Lok Sabha.

He was also elected as Member of the Legislative Assembly (India)(MLA) from Yellareddy Assembly constituency of Nizamabad district and worked as Cabinet Minister in both former Chief Ministers Tanguturi Anjaiah and Bhavanam Venkataram Reddy cabinets.

Personal details

Bala Goud was born on 2 October 1931 in llapuram village of Nizamabad district of Telangana.  He later married Lakshmi Devi.

Political career
Goud began his political career at village level as a Panchayat member and rose to become a Member of the Legislative Assembly and a member of the parliament of India.

He was elected as MLA from  Yellareddy Assembly constituency of Nizamabad district in 1978 from Indian National Congress party but lost in 1983 from the same constituency. He worked as a cabinet minister till 1982.

He was later twice elected as a member of Parliament of India from Nizamabad parliamentary constituency in 1984 and 1989 but lost in 1991 elections.

He headed several backward castes organisations to develop alternate political force and build unity among several associations and parties working for the welfare of backward castes and weaker sections in Andhra Pradesh.
He was convenor of Backward Classes Joint Action Committee(JAC) - which foresees the welfares of backward classes and decides whether new castes can be added to the existing Backward Classes category.
He was the president of Andhra Pradesh BC Sangham 
He headed the nine-member sub-committee constituted by the Backward Classes United Front - To foster unity among different backward classes organisations and parties namely - Rajyadhikara Party headed by V.G.R Naragoni, Mana Party headed by Kasani Gnaneshwar, AP State BC Welfare Association headed by R. Krishnaiah, and BC United Front Party headed by P. Ramakrishnaiah .

Positions held

References

External links
https://web.archive.org/web/20080210185843/http://164.100.24.209/newls/lokprev.aspx
http://parliamentofindia.nic.in/ls/comb/combalpha.htm#13lsb
https://web.archive.org/web/20080515071756/http://www.telangana.com/Nizamabad/nzb_poli.htm
http://parliamentofindia.nic.in/ls/lok09/alpha/09lsb.htm
http://parliamentofindia.nic.in/ls/lok08/alpha/08lsb.htm

Telugu politicians
Telangana politicians
1931 births
Indian National Congress politicians from Telangana
2010 deaths
India MPs 1984–1989
India MPs 1989–1991
Lok Sabha members from Andhra Pradesh
People from Nizamabad district